Donja Dubrava (Kajkavian: Dolnja Dobrava) is a village and municipality in Međimurje County, Croatia. Donja Dubrava is the only village within the municipality. According to the 2011 census, the village had 1,920 inhabitants, mostly Croats.

The village of Donja Dubrava is located on the shores of the Drava river, at the confluence of the outflow canal from the artificial Lake Dubrava into the natural flow of the Drava. Lake Dubrava, the largest artificial lake in Croatia, and the hydroelectric power plant it is used for are named after the village. The confluence of the Mura into the Drava is also very close to the village, just over 5 kilometers to the south-east. A road bridge connecting Međimurje with Podravina is just outside the village.

See also 
Dobrava (toponym)

References

External links
Official website  

Municipalities of Croatia
Populated places in Međimurje County